Laurier, a federal electoral district in Quebec, Canada, was represented in the House of Commons of Canada from 1935 to 1988.

It was set up in 1933 from parts of Laurier—Outremont and Saint-Denis ridings. It was abolished in 1987 when it was redistributed into Laurier—Sainte-Marie, Outremont, Rosemont and Saint-Henri—Westmount ridings.

The riding was re-created in 2003, and renamed Laurier—Sainte-Marie in 2004.

Members of Parliament

This riding elected the following Members of Parliament:

Election results

See also
List of Canadian federal electoral districts
Past Canadian electoral districts

External links
Riding history from the Library of Parliament

Former federal electoral districts of Quebec